Max Gottwald (born 13 September 2000) is a German footballer who most recently played in the United States for South Florida Bulls.

References

Living people
1999 births
German footballers
Association football defenders
SC Preußen Münster players
FC Carl Zeiss Jena players
South Florida Bulls men's soccer players
3. Liga players
Oberliga (football) players
German expatriate footballers
German expatriate sportspeople in the United States
Expatriate soccer players in the United States